Media station is a SEPTA regional rail station in Upper Providence Township, Delaware County, Pennsylvania, near Media. It serves the Media/Wawa Line, the former Pennsylvania Railroad (PRR) West Chester Line. It is located at 301 Media Station Road (Orange Street and Station Road). The station includes a 231-space parking lot. In 2013, this station saw 692 boardings and 533 alightings on an average weekday. 

Media station was built in 1960 by the PRR and is located several blocks away from Media–Orange Street station, the terminus of the SEPTA Route 101 line. However, no direct connection exists between the station and the trolley stop.

Woodrow Wilson spoke at the Media station in 1912 during his first election campaign.

Station layout
Media has two low-level side platforms with a connecting pathway across the tracks.

References

External links

Media Station | SEPTA
 Orange Street entrance from Google Maps Street View

SEPTA Regional Rail stations
Stations on the West Chester Line
Former Pennsylvania Railroad stations
Railway stations in Delaware County, Pennsylvania
Railway stations in the United States opened in 1854
1854 establishments in Pennsylvania